Swansea Rugby Football Club is a Welsh rugby union team which plays in the Welsh Premiership. The club play at St Helen's Rugby and Cricket Ground in Swansea and are also known as The Whites, in reference to their home kit colours.

History
The club was founded in 1872 as an association football team, switching to the rugby code in 1874, and in 1881 it became one of the eleven founder clubs of the Welsh Rugby Union.

In the early twentieth century Swansea RFC was an extremely successful club. For four consecutive seasons Swansea were the unofficial Welsh champions from the 1898–99 season through to 1901/02, coinciding with the heyday of Swansea's first star player Billy Bancroft. Under the captaincy of Frank Gordon the team would later go on a 22-month unbeaten run, from December 1903 through to October 1905. During this period Swansea appeared to be under-represented at international level. Gordon himself went uncapped throughout his entire career, and apart from Billy Trew, Dick Jones and Dicky Owen, the only other internationals in the senior team were forward Sid Bevan (1 cap), wing Jowett (1 cap) and outside-half Phil Hopkins (4 caps). Trew (29 caps) was an outstanding centre who was accepted as one of the most important players in the evolution of Welsh rugby, while Dicky Owen (35 caps), although only 5-foot 4 inches tall, was an incredible tactician.

The immediate post war years brought only limited success, although a notable 6–6 draw was achieved against New Zealand in 1953 followed by a 9–8 victory against Australia in 1966. It was not until the club's centenary season in 1973/74, however, that the club became Merit Table Champions. Swansea achieved further success as club champions in 1979/80, 1980/81, 1982/83 as well as Welsh cup winners in 1978.

Players during this period included Clem Thomas, Billy Williams, Dewi Bebb, Mervyn Davies, Geoff Wheel, David Richards and Mark Wyatt, the club's record points scorer with 2,740 points scored between 1976/77 and 1991/92.

The 1990s saw success for the club, including being league champions on 4 occasions (1991/92, 1993/94, 1997/98 and 2000/01) and Welsh cup winners in 1995 and 1999. A memorable 21–6 victory was recorded over then World champions Australia at St Helens on 4 November 1992. In season 1995/96 Swansea reached the semi-final stage of the European Cup. This period also included disputes with the Welsh Rugby Union over the way the league structure was being run in Wales following rugby union's move to being a professional game, which culminated in the club's boycott of the 1998/99 league season, in what was referred to as the rebel season.

The 2003/04 season has seen a significant change with the introduction of regional rugby in Wales. Swansea Rugby Football Club Ltd, alongside Neath RFC are co-owners of the Ospreys. As a result, Swansea RFC returned to being an amateur team. Since the change to regional rugby Several players have played for Swansea RFC, as well Ospreys and Wales including Alun Wyn Jones, Ryan Jones, Scott Baldwin, Nicky Smith, Matthew Morgan, Eli Walker, Gavin Henson and Dan Biggar.

In 2014 the All Whites were relegated from the Welsh Premier league on the final day of the season when despite beating Neath at St Helens, a bonus point for Aberavon sent Swansea into the SWALEC Championship. This provoked a complete revamp of the club with Stephen Hughes taking the position of Chairman, Keith Colclough as Managing Director and Richard Lancaster leading a coaching team of former players including Rhodri Jones, Chris Loader and Ben Lewis. In their first season Swansea missed out on promotion back to the Premiership, finishing in second place overall, but were consequently promoted in the 15/16 season along with Merthyr, RGC 1404 and Bargoed.

Swansea struggled to adapt to the Premiership in their first two seasons back at the top flight although despite a crippling injury list, the 17/18 season showed much promise with the side recording five wins, a draw and 10 losing bonus points for losing the game within 7 points.

The 2018/19 season is a hugely important season for the club with potentially five clubs being relegated from the Welsh Premiership in order for the league to contain 12 teams in the 19/20 season. The coaching team of Richard Lancaster, Hugh Gustafson, Ben Lewis, Nick Roberts and Liam Carpener-Jones are currently preparing a squad consisting of many of the 17/18 squad along with new additions which are being announced on the club website regularly.

Achievements
Swansea RFC defeated New Zealand 11–3 on Saturday 28 September 1935, becoming the first ever club side to beat the All Blacks. The victory also made them the first club team to beat all three of the major touring teams to Britain; they had previously beaten Australia in 1908 and South Africa in 1912.

In November 1992, Swansea RFC defeated world champions Australia 21–6, when Australia played their first match of their Welsh Tour.

Welsh Premier Division champions in:
1991/1992
1993/1994
1997/1998
2000/2001

Welsh Cup champions in:
1977/1978
1994/1995
1998/1999

Whitbread Merit Table champions in:
 1980/1981

Snelling Sevens champions in:
 1982
 1989
 1991
 1995

Club officials
 Honorary president: Stan Addicott
 Chairmen: Stephen Hughes
 Managing Director: Keith Colclough
 Honorary Secretary: Alun Donovan
 Board Members: David Blyth, Paul Whapham, Siwan Lillicrap
 Former Players Association Chair: Huw Rees

Current Team Management
 Director of Rugby: Richard Lancaster
 Team Manager: Chris James
 Assistant coach: Hugh Gustafson 
 Assistant coach: Ben Lewis
 Assistant coach: Nick Roberts
 Assistant coach: J Rhys Williams
 Assistant coach: Liam Carperner-Jones
 Team Physios: Nikki Donovan, Jessica Hegarty
 Team Doctors: Dr Katy Guy, Dr Daniel Eckford, Dr Craig Dyson
 Equipment Managers: Ian Hopkins, John Mcknight

Current squad

British and Irish Lions
The following former players were selected for the British and Irish Lions touring squads while playing for Swansea RFC.

Wales International Captains
The following former players captained the Wales national rugby union team while playing for Swansea RFC.

See also Wales rugby union captains

Other notable former players
The players listed below have played for Swansea and have also played international rugby.

Games played against international opposition

Bibliography

References

External links
Swansea RFC/The Whites

Welsh Rugby Union

 
Welsh rugby union teams
Rugby clubs established in 1874
Rugby union in Swansea
1874 establishments in Wales